In mathematics, a Kochanek–Bartels spline or Kochanek–Bartels curve is a cubic Hermite spline with tension, bias, and continuity parameters defined to change the behavior of the tangents.

Given n + 1 knots,

p0, ...,  pn,

to be interpolated with n cubic Hermite curve segments, for each curve we have a starting point pi and an ending point pi+1 with starting tangent di and ending tangent di+1 defined by

where...

Setting each parameter to zero would give a Catmull–Rom spline.

The source code found here of Steve Noskowicz in 1996 actually describes the impact that each of these values has on the drawn curve:

The code includes matrix summary needed to generate these splines in a BASIC dialect.

External links 

Splines (mathematics)
Interpolation